The Wreck of the Mary Deare is a 1959 Metrocolor (in CinemaScope) British-American thriller film directed by Michael Anderson and starring Gary Cooper and Charlton Heston, and featuring Michael Redgrave, Cecil Parker, Richard Harris and John Le Mesurier. The screenplay by Eric Ambler was based on the 1956 novel of the same name by Hammond Innes.

Plot
The steamship Mary Deare, out of Hong Kong, is found adrift at sea in a storm in the English Channel by salvager John Sands. Sands boards it hoping to claim it for salvage, but finds Gideon Patch, former first officer who has been captain for four days since the death of Taggart, the previous captain, still aboard and trying to run the ship on his own.  Patch gives Sands mysterious hints about two fires, a dynamite incident and having been hit on the head and left on the ship when the crew abandoned it four days before. He refuses to let the ship be claimed for salvage, and insists on running it onto rocks in the dangerous region of the Minquiers, so that it will stay above water until an official inspection by a board of inquiry in England. Sands tries to get back to his own ship, the Sea Witch, and cannot because of the storm; Patch saves his life by pulling him back onto the Mary Deare. Sands reluctantly joins him in running the ship, with much effort in the flooded engine room, onto a reef in the Minquiers.

When the two reach land, Sands learns that the survivors among the crew, led by second officer Higgins, are claiming that Patch gave an unnecessary order to abandon ship. A boat containing the officers who were not allies of Higgins was lost, and they are claiming Patch was responsible for the deaths of those men. The owner of the ship, the insurance company and the salvage company put pressure on Patch and Sands, who remains Patch's ally, but Patch insists on a board of inquiry. He visits Captain Taggart's daughter Janet, who lets him borrow a page of a letter from her father that mentions being anchored for days beside another ship in the harbour at Rangoon. Patch's story gradually emerges: Higgins and his allies were in a conspiracy with the shipowners in which they offloaded their most important cargo, high-quality American-made airplane engines being sent home from the Korean War, to the other ship at Rangoon, possibly to sell them to the Communist Chinese. Then they destroyed the ship's communications, blew a hole in its side with dynamite and fired the engine room to sink the ship slowly while they got away, destroying the evidence that the engines were no longer on board. They took advantage of the fact that Captain Taggart was an alcoholic having a breakdown.

Patch finally gets his board of inquiry, but it goes badly for him: the lawyer for the owners presents Higgins' story as the credible record of events, and Patch's credibility is damaged when he has to admit that he accidentally killed Captain Taggart while trying to control him in a fit of delirium. The judges do not allow Patch to read his version of events into the record. The lawyer then announces that the Mary Deare has been found by a survey from the air, and a French salvage crew is now working to refloat it and take it to shore. Janet, who suspects the owner's party, tells Patch that Higgins will be on board when the ship floats, and Patch realizes that in its weakened condition it will be easy for one man to sink it in deep water, so that it will never be known that the engines are missing.

Patch steals Sands' salvage boat to get to the Mary Deare and prevent this; Sands, after catching him fueling the boat, joins him. They don diving suits and get into the ship underwater through the dynamite hole, and they indeed find that the engine boxes are filled with rocks and not engines. Higgins has seen Patch's and Sands' underwater lights as they entered through the hole. Higgins then traps them in the flooded hold by locking the hatch they entered through and waits at the only other exit from the flooded decks with a harpoon. His two friends are reluctant to actually kill, but Higgins wounds Sands with the harpoon. Patch and Sands fool him into striking at emptiness with lights on a pole, pull him into the water and subdue him. When they emerge, Higgins' friends abandon the murderous plot, and the French salvagers call the authorities. Patch is vindicated, and says to Sands that the only thing he wants is another ship to command.

Cast

 Gary Cooper as Gideon Patch
 Charlton Heston as John Sands
 Michael Redgrave as Mr Nyland
 Emlyn Williams as Sir Wilfred Falcett
 Cecil Parker as The Chairman
 Alexander Knox as Petrie
 Virginia McKenna as Janet Taggart
 Richard Harris as Higgins
 Ben Wright as Mike
 Peter Illing as Gunderson
 Terence De Marney as Frank
 Charles Davis as Yules, Quartermaster on Mary Deare
 Ashley Cowan as Burrows

Production
The novel was optioned by Metro-Goldwyn-Mayer with the intention of having Alfred Hitchcock direct the picture (under a two-picture deal), starring Gary Cooper and Burt Lancaster. Hitchcock had long wanted to work with Cooper, who had been asked to star in Foreign Correspondent in 1940, and Lancaster, who had been asked to star in Under Capricorn in 1948. After developing the script with Ernest Lehman for several weeks, they concluded that it could not be done without turning the film into "a boring courtroom drama". They abandoned the idea and started a new story which eventually became North by Northwest.

The task of adapting the novel passed to Eric Ambler. British director Michael Anderson took over for Hitchcock. The cast included Cooper as Patch, and Charlton Heston as Sands, with Richard Harris and Sir Michael Redgrave in supporting roles. Critics generally agree that the finished film matches Hitchcock and Lehman's prediction. There were long delays in filming due to Gary Cooper's ill health, although he was not diagnosed with cancer until the spring of 1960.

Box office

According to MGM records the film earned $1,165,000 in the US and Canada and $1,650,000 elsewhere.

See also
 List of American films of 1959
 List of unproduced Hitchcock projects

References

External links
 
 
 
 
 

1950s thriller films
1959 films
American thriller films
British thriller films
1950s English-language films
Films about seafaring accidents or incidents
Films based on British novels
Films based on works by Hammond Innes
Films directed by Michael Anderson
Films scored by George Duning
Films set in London
Films set in the Channel Islands
Seafaring films
Films shot at MGM-British Studios
1950s American films
1950s British films